Vénérolles is a commune in the Aisne department in Hauts-de-France in northern France. It is 10 km north of Guise, and 40 km south east of Cambrai.

The church of Saint-Timothée dates from the 16th century.

The Canal de la Sambre à l'Oise flows through the village.

Population

See also
Communes of the Aisne department

References

Communes of Aisne